Noon Hill may refer to:

 Noon Hill (reservation)
 Noon Hill (North West England)